Andreas Stübel, also: Stiefel (15 December 1653 – 31 January 1725) was a German Lutheran theologian, pedagogue and philosopher.

Career 
After the Abitur, he studied philosophy, philology and theology at the University of Leipzig, graduating in 1674 a Baccalaureus and in 1676 a Magister of philosophy. He then worked as a private teacher. In 1687 he was a Baccalaureus of theology, appointed a private lecturer at the Leipzig University. In 1697 he lost the position due to theological disputes. He died in Leipzig.

Selected works 
 Neues Leipziger Wörterbuch (1703)

Reference

Literature

External links 
 Andreas Stübel im Stadtwiki Dresden

German male writers
German Lutheran theologians
German philosophers
1653 births
1725 deaths